Henry Wise Wood High School (HWW) is a public high school located in the southwest quadrant of Calgary, Alberta.

The school was built in 1961 and is named after Henry Wise Wood, an Alberta pioneer who was instrumental in forming the Alberta Wheat Pool and the United Farmers of Alberta. Wood is regarded as an influential individual in Canadian agricultural and farming history.

Academically, the school offers the International Baccalaureate Programme (IB), and the Gifted and Talented Education Program (GATE), in addition to the full range of academic programs standard to the province. The school also offers the Calgary Board of Education's Traditional Learning Centre program. The school is part of the Action for Bright Children Society. A unique option in the IB Programme that the school offers to students as an additional Group 3 subject is Philosophy 20/30 SL IB, which is made available bi-annually.

Henry Wise Wood has a music program that includes a symphonic band, jazz band, and choir.

Athletics programs 

Henry Wise Wood is noted for its football team, having won several city championships over the years. The school also has many other sports teams, including soccer, badminton, swimming, basketball, volleyball, rugby, and track.

Wise Wood features number of athletics programs and teams which include:
 Swimming 
 Cross Country Running 
 Curling
 Football 
 Rugby
 Soccer
 Basketball
 Badminton
 Track and Field
 Volleyball
 Field Hockey

Notable alumni

 Ari Taub (born 1971), Olympic Greco-Roman wrestler
 Pierre Poilievre (born 1979), Leader of the Opposition Canada

References

High schools in Calgary
International Baccalaureate schools in Alberta
Educational institutions established in 1961
1961 establishments in Alberta